Detroit Diesel is a French Canadian harsh EBM duo, founded in 2006, signed on Deathwatch Asia and Infacted-Recordings.
It is not to be confused with the American diesel engine manufacturer of the same name.

History
Detroit Diesel released their first demo, Dancing with Terror, in 2008, with the song "When Darkness Falls" appearing on the Endzeit Bunkertracks IV compilation. Shortly after, Detroit Diesel underwent an internal restructuring.

In 2009, Detroit Diesel recorded the Terre Humaine demo, featuring ten songs, including the self-titled song "Terre Humaine" that would later appear on the 2010 Kinetik Festival compilation.

Detroit Diesel signed to Deathwatch Asia who decided to release the album Terre Humaine, consolidated from the previous demo, in 2010. The Lost Signals EP was released by Deathwatch Asia and Infacted Recordings in digital format.

The full-length debut album Terre Humaine was released on November 12, 2010 and was manufactured by Infacted Recordings for the European market, with Deathwatch Asia serving the rest of the world. Terre Humaine was reviewed favourably by the Side-Line webzine as "dark electro style" with "technoid tunes". The German Sonic Seducer review was also favourable, calling it a "notable debut".

A second full-length album Coup d'Etat was published on May 29, 2012. Manufactured by Infacted Recordings (EU), Vendetta Music (US) and with Deathwatch Asia serving the rest of the world. This was followed by their first European tour.

Discography

Albums

EPs

Demo 
 Dancing With Terror (CDr, EP)  Not On Label  2008

Compilations
"Let It Be My End" 	Direct World Action For Japan  	2011
"Normandy (D-Day Mix)" 	World Wide Electronics Volume One 	2011
"The Game" 	Zillo CD 04/2011 	2011
"Serenade" 	Gothic Compilation Part L 	2011
"Lost Signal (Freakangel Remix)" 	Advanced Electronics Vol. 8 	2010
"Normandy (D-Day Mix)" 	Bleed by Example 	2010,/br>
"Lost Signal (Freakangel Remix)" 	Infacted Vol. 5 	2010
"All Lost Before Dawn" 	Mecha[nized] 	2010
"Terre Humaine " 	Kinetik Festival Vol. 3 	2010
"When Darkness Falls " 	Endzeit Bunkertracks [Act - IV] 	2009

Compilations Appearences 
Infactious Vol Four 2014 
DWA XxX (100 Remixes) 2013 
Schwarze Nacht Tanz 6 2012 
Aderlass Vol. 8 2012
Nachtaktiv Magazin-CD 1 // 08 - 2012
Zillo CD-04/2012
Gothic Spirits (EBM Edition 4) 2012  
Electronic Saviors Volume 2: Recurrence - Metropolis Records 2012 
Schwarze Nacht Tanz 6 2012  
Deathwatch Asia - 2012 Festival Tour Europe 2012
World Wide Electronics Vol. 1 - Out Of line 2011
Direct World Action For Japan - Deathwatch Asia 2011
Zillo CD 04/2011 (CD, Comp)  Zillo  2011
Gothic Compilation Part L - Batbeliever Releases 2011
Advanced Electronics Vol. 8 - SPV GmbH  2010
Rock Oracle Compilation #5- Rock Oracle Magazine 2010
Gothic Compilation Part XLIX - Batbeliever Releases 2010
Infacted Vol. 5 -  Infacted Recordings 2010
Kinetik Festival Vol. 3 - Artoffact 2010
Endzeit Bunkertracks [Act - IV] - Alfa-Matrix 2009

References

External links
Infacted-recordings
Official 
Detroit Diesel at Discogs.com

Electronic body music groups
Electro-industrial music groups